Massachusetts's 7th congressional district is a congressional district located in eastern Massachusetts, including roughly three-fourths of the city of Boston and a few of its northern and southern suburbs. The seat is currently held by Democrat Ayanna Pressley.

Due to redistricting after the 2010 census, the borders of the district were changed, with most of the old 7th district redistricted to the new 5th district, and most of the old 8th district comprising the new 7th district. With a partisan lean of D+35 according to the Cook Political Report, the 7th is the most Democratic district in Massachusetts, and one of the most Democratic districts in the United States.

According to The Boston Globe and the latest census data, approximately 33 percent of the population of the district were born outside of the United States, with approximately 34 percent of the population white, 26 percent African American, and 21 percent Latino.

In 2019, Ayanna Presley became the first female and person of color to represent the district as well as the Commonwealth of Massachusetts in Congress.

Election results from presidential races

Cities and towns in the district 
 Boston:
 Wards 1, 2
 Ward 3: Precincts 7, 8
 Ward 4
 Ward 5: Precincts 1, 2, 2A, 6-10
 Ward 7: Precinct 10
 Wards 8-10
 Ward 11: Precincts 1-8
 Ward 12
 Ward 13: Precincts 1, 2, 4-6, 8 and 9
 Ward 14
 Ward 15
 Ward 16: Precincts 1, 3, 4, 6, 8, 11
 Ward 17
 Ward 18
 Ward 19: Precincts 7, 10-13
 Ward 20: Precinct 3
 Wards 21 and 22
(the remainder of Boston is in the 8th district)
 Cambridge:
 Wards 1, 2, 3, 5, 11
 Ward 4: Precinct 1
 Ward 10: Precinct 3
(the remainder of Cambridge is in the 5th district)
 Chelsea
 Everett
 Milton:
 Precincts 1, 5 and 10
(the remainder of Milton is in the 8th district)
 Randolph
 Somerville

Cities and towns in the district prior to 2013

1790s-1830s

1840s
1849: "The whole of Berkshire County; Ashfield, Buckland, Charlemont, Coleraine, Conway, Hawley, Heath, Leyden, Monroe, Rowe, and Shelburne, in Franklin County; Chesterfield, Cummington, Goshen, Middlefield, Norwich, Plainfield, Southampton, Westhampton, Williamsburg, and Worthington, in Hampshire County; and Blandford, Chester, Granville, Montgomery, Russell, and Tolland, in the County of Hampden."

1850s-1880s
An act of the legislature passed April 22, 1852 divided the 7th district of Massachusetts as such: "The towns of Andover, Boxford, Bradford, Danvers, Haverhill, Lawrence, Lynnfield, Methuen, Middleton, Saugus, and Topsfield in the county of Essex; and the city of Charlestown, and the towns of Burlington, Lexington, Malden, Medford, Melrose, Reading, Somerville, South Reading, Stoneham, Waltham, and Woburn, in the county of Middlesex."

1890s

1893: "Essex County: Towns of Lynn, Nahant, and Saugus. Middlesex County: Towns of Everett, Malden, Melrose, Stoneham, and Wakefield.
Suffolk County: 4th and 5th wards of the city of Boston, and the towns of Chelsea and Revere."

1910s
1916: In Essex County: Boxford, Lawrence, Lynn, Lynnfield, Middleton, Nahant, North Andover, Peabody, Saugus. In Middlesex County: North Reading.

1940s
1941: In Essex County: Lawrence, Lynn (part), Middleton, Nahant, North Andover, Peabody. In Suffolk County: Chelsea, Revere, Winthrop.

1950s-2002

2003-2013 

In Middlesex County:
 Arlington
 Belmont
 Everett
 Framingham
 Lexington
 Lincoln
 Malden
 Medford
 Melrose
 Natick
 Stoneham
 Waltham
 Watertown
 Wayland: Precinct 2
 Weston
 Winchester
 Woburn

In Suffolk County:
 Revere
 Winthrop

List of members representing the district

Recent election results

2012

2014

2016

2018

2020

Notes

References

Citations

General sources 
 
 
 Congressional Biographical Directory of the United States 1774–present

External links

 Map of Massachusetts's 7th Congressional District, via Massachusetts Secretary of the Commonwealth

Election results 
 CNN.com 2004 election results
 CNN.com 2006 election results

Government of Middlesex County, Massachusetts
Government of Suffolk County, Massachusetts
07
Constituencies established in 1789
1789 establishments in Massachusetts